Tarset railway station served the civil parish of Tarset, Northumberland, England from 1862 to 1958 on the Border Counties Railway.

History 
The station was opened on 1 February 1862 by the North British Railway. 

It was situated at the end of an approach road and half a mile southwest of the hamlet of Lanehead. The platform was on the down side with a siding and goods dock. There was a two-ton crane on the dock and the station was able to cope with most sorts of goods including vehicles and livestock. 

The station was host to a LNER camping coach from 1936 to 1939. 

The station was downgraded to an unstaffed halt on 9 September 1955 when it was renamed Tarset Halt.

The station closed to passengers on 15 October 1956 and completely on 1 September 1958.

References

External links 
 Tarset station

Disused railway stations in Northumberland
Former North British Railway stations
Railway stations in Great Britain opened in 1861
Railway stations in Great Britain closed in 1956
1861 establishments in England
1958 disestablishments in England